WYXI (1390 AM, "Wixie Radio") is a radio station broadcasting a combination oldies/talk/personality format. Licensed to Athens, Tennessee, United States, the station is currently owned by Cornerstone Broadcasting, Inc. and features programming from Citadel Media and Premiere Radio Networks.

References

External links

YXI
Oldies radio stations in the United States
McMinn County, Tennessee